Craig Garrett Taylor (born January 3, 1966) is a former professional American football running back in the National Football League. He played three seasons for the Cincinnati Bengals (1989–1991).

Taylor attended Linden High School in Linden, New Jersey.

External links
NFL.com player page

References

1966 births
Living people
Linden High School (New Jersey) alumni

Sportspeople from Elizabeth, New Jersey
People from Linden, New Jersey
Players of American football from New Jersey
American football running backs
West Virginia Mountaineers football players
Cincinnati Bengals players